Anthony Michael Kurta (born September 4, 1959) is a retired United States Navy Rear Admiral and government official. Having served as the Acting Under Secretary of Defense for Personnel and Readiness for most of 2017, he is President Donald Trump's nominee to become Principal Deputy Under Secretary of Defense for Personnel and Readiness. Kurta previously served as Deputy Assistant Secretary of Defense for Military Personnel Policy and Director of Navy Flag Officer Management and Development.

Kurta is the son of John Anthony Kurta (January 27, 1922 – June 17, 1993) and Virginia Elizabeth (Malone) Kurta (May 3, 1922 – January 12, 1970). He was born in Deer Lodge, Montana and raised in Columbia Falls, Montana. Kurta graduated from the United States Naval Academy in 1981. He later earned an M.A. in National Security Studies from Georgetown University.

Kurta served 32 years on active duty as a Navy Surface Warfare Officer, during which time he commanded the USS Sentry (MCM-3), USS Guardian (MCM-5), USS Warrior (MCM-10), USS Carney, Destroyer Squadron Two Four, and Combined Joint Task Force – Horn of Africa. He is a recipient of the Defense Superior Service Medal, Legion of Merit, Meritorious Service Medal, Distinguished Service Medal, Navy and Marine Corps Commendation Medal, Navy and Marine Corps Achievement Medal, and the Secretary of Defense Meritorious Civilian Service Award.

Kurta's nomination to be a Principal Deputy Under Secretary of Defense was reported favorably by the United States Senate Committee on Armed Services on November 16, 2017 but failed to receive consideration by the full Senate. The nomination was withdrawn on September 28, 2018.

References

External links
 Biography at the U.S. Department of Defense
 United States Navy Biography

1959 births
Living people
People from Deer Lodge, Montana
People from Columbia Falls, Montana
United States Naval Academy alumni
Georgetown University alumni
United States Navy admirals
United States Under Secretaries of Defense
Obama administration personnel
Trump administration personnel